Maṇimēkalai (Tamil: மணிமேகலை, lit. 'jewelled belt, girdle of gems'), also spelled Manimekhalai or Manimekalai, is a Tamil-Buddhist epic composed by Kulavāṇikaṉ Seethalai Sataṉar probably around the 6th century.It is an "anti-love story", a sequel to the "love story" in the earliest Tamil epic Silappadikaram, with some characters from it and their next generation. The epic consists of 4,861 lines in akaval meter, arranged in 30 cantos.

The Manimekalai is one of the Five Great Epics of Tamil Literature, and one of three that have survived into the modern age.[9][10] Along with its twin-epic Silappadikaram, the Manimekalai is widely considered as an important text that provides insights into the life, culture and society of the Tamil regions (India and Sri Lanka) in the early centuries of the common era. The last cantos of the epic – particularly Canto 27 – are also a window into then extant ideas of Mahayana Buddhism, Jainism, Ajivika, and Hinduism, as well as the history of interreligious rivalries and cooperation as practiced and understood by the Tamil population in a period of Dravidian–Aryan synthesis and as the Indian religions were evolving .

Etymology
In Pali,  refers to a girdle or belt of jewels. In Southeast Asia, she is known by various indigenized appellations, including as Mani Maykhala in Burmese, as Moni Mekhala or Neang Mekhala in Khmer; as Mani Mekkhala in Thai.

In Mainland Southeast Asia

Archaeological evidence of Manimekhala in the form of reliefs has been found in Zothoke, Myanmar (near Bilin), dating to the first millennium AD.

Manimekhala is seen in wat paintings across Mainland Southeast Asia depicting scenes from the Mahajanaka. In Thailand and Cambodia, she is considered a goddess of lightning and the seas.

Manimekhala and Ramasura
The story of Manimekhala and Ramasura is mentioned many times in the classical literature of Cambodia and Thailand. It depicts Manimekhala along with Ramasura (usually considered a depiction of Parashurama) and Arjuna. According to legend, the phenomena of lightning and thunder is produced from the flashing of Manimekhala's crystal ball and the sound of Ramasura's axe as he pursues her through the skies.

In Sri Lanka
In Sri Lanka, she is considered to be the sea goddess. In the Tamil epic poem, the Manimekalai, she puts the eponymous heroine to sleep and takes her to the island Maṇipallavam (Nainatheevu). In the mythic cycle of the god Devol, when the latter approaches Sri Lanka and his ship founders, it is Manimekhalai, on the instructions of the god Śakra, who conjures up a stone boat to save him.

Dance

In the classical dance traditions of Thailand and Cambodia, sacred dramatic dances depict the story of Manimekhala and Ramasura.

Cambodia 
Robam Moni Mekhala (also known as Robam Mekhala-Reamesor) is a Khmer classical dance that portrays the story of Moni Mekhala and Reamesor. It is part of the buong suong dance suite that is among the most sacred of Khmer classical dances, serving a ceremonial purpose to invoke rain upon the land.

Thailand 
In Thailand, the Mekkhala–Ramasun dance was performed as a boek rong ('prelude dance') introduction before main performances of lakhon nai or khon dances.

In modern usage
The popular Burmese pop singer Maykhala derives her stage name from Manimekhala.
Her name was contributed by Thailand for tropical cyclone names occurring as Tropical Storm Mekkhala in 2002, 2008, 2015, and 2020. Also, one award given to the television industry in Thailand since 1980 is called the Mekkhala Award.

See also
Jataka tales, from Khuddaka Nikāya
Mahanipata Jataka
Robam Moni Mekhala
Mazu, Chinese Goddess of Sea
Nyai Roro Kidul, Queen of Southern Sea worshipped by Javanese and Sundanese in Indonesia

References

External links

 The Goddess and the Ogre - A Cambodian Legend

Sea and river goddesses
Buddhist folklore
Thunder goddesses
Cambodian legends
Burmese folklore
Cambodian folklore
Laotian folklore
Thai folklore
Indian folklore
Indian legends